Nathan David Bryon (born 3 July 1991) is a British actor, author, and screenwriter. He gained prominence through his roles as Jamie Bennett in the BBC Three sitcom Some Girls (2012–2014) and Joey Ellis in the ITV sitcom Benidorm (2016–2018). 

In June 2019, Puffin published Bryon's first book, Look Up!, conceived jointly with illustrator Dapo Adeola. It won both the overall award and the illustrated book award at the 2020 Waterstones Children's Book Prize. Adeola later complained that, although Bryon had given him full credit for his part in the book's creation, both the book trade and the media minimized the significance of the illustrator's role.

Bryon published a play in July 2019 called Dexter and Winter's Detective Agency and another book in July 2020 called Clean Up.

In March 2021, Puffin announced Nathan as the first Puffin World of Stories ambassador.

He wrote and co-created Bloods, a sitcom on Sky Comedy that debuted in 2021. He co-wrote his first feature film screenplay for Rye Lane with Tom Melia, directed by Raine Allen-Miller, which premiered at the 2023 Sundance Film Festival.

Early life
Bryon was born in Shepherd's Bush, London, to a white British father and a Jamaican mother. He attended ADT school (now Ashcroft Technology Academy) in Putney.

Filmography

References

External links
 

Living people
1991 births
21st-century British male actors
21st-century British screenwriters
Black British male actors
Black British writers
British male television actors
English children's writers
English male screenwriters
English people of Jamaican descent
Male actors from London
People from Shepherd's Bush
Writers from London